Taryn Lewis 'Taz' Taylor (born 21 January 1998 in Mansfield, Nottinghamshire) is a British former Grand Prix motorcycle racer as a result of participating in the Moto3 event as a Wildcard ride at the 2015 British Grand Prix at Silverstone.

He now races in the British MotoStar Championship aboard a KTM RC 250 GP.

Career statistics

Grand Prix motorcycle racing

By season

Races by year

References

External links

Taz Taylor Racing at Facebook

Sportspeople from Mansfield
English motorcycle racers
Living people
1998 births
Supersport 300 World Championship riders
Moto3 World Championship riders